Bastard Eyes is a remix album from the band Zilch, released on March 3, 1999. The tracks on this album are remixes, done by numerous different bands and artists, of the songs from their debut album 3.2.1.. The limited edition reached number 5 on the Oricon chart, while the regular peaked at number 24.

Track list

References

 https://web.archive.org/web/20101203120202/http://hide-city.com/discography/album.html#1212554585
 https://archive.today/20121219154456/http://www2s.biglobe.ne.jp/~reiko/database/works/workhide2.html
 http://www.mfyi.com/z/zilchdiscography.html

1999 remix albums
Zilch (band) albums